Following is a list of non-tertiary schools in the Asian country of Cambodia.  Tertiary schools are included in List of universities in Cambodia.

Norodom Sihanouk
Samdech Euv High School - schools named after Norodom Sihanouk or Norodom Sihanu Varaman.

Schools by province

Banteay Meanchey

  Prey Chan Nippon Foundation School in district O Chrov
  Ta En Nippon Foundation School in district Mongkul Borei
  Dang Run Nippon Foundation School in district Mongkul Borei
  Fumiko Oshima School in district Serei Saôphôn
  Khi Lek Nippon Foundation School in district Mongkul Borei
  Khy Lek KDDI School in district Mongkul Borei
  Kimiko Morisaki School No. One in district Serei Saôphôn
  Kimiko Morisaki School No. Two in district O Chrov
  Kork Romiet Nippon Foundation School in district Thmar Pourk
  O Sngourt Nippon Foundation School in district Moungkul Borei
  Phoum Kor Nippon Foundation School in district O Chrov
  Prey Kub Nippon Foundation School in district O Chrov
  Snourl Treit Nippon Foundation School in district O Chrov
  Tokunori Morisaki School No. One in district Serei Saôphôn
  Tokunori Morisaki School No. Two in district Mongkul Borei
  Yeang Dan Kum Nippon Foundation School in district O Chrov

Battambang

  Angkor Ban Nippon Foundation School in district Sampouv Loun
  Arbor School of Hope in district Phnom Prek
  Beng Tret Nippon Foundation School in district Sampov Loun
  Boeung Ktum Nippon Foundation School in district Ratanak Mondol
  Brian Murphy School in district Sampouv Loun
  Cham Ro A Nippon Foundation School in district Mong Russei
  Chork Toch Nippon Foundation School in district Mong Russei
  Chroy Sdao Nippon Foundation School in district Thmat Kol
  Clark Hamagami School in district Koh Kralor
  Clumsy Hans School in district Thmar Kaul
  Daun Bar Nippon Foundation School in district Kas Kra Lar
  Emperor’s New Clothes School in district Sampov Lun
  Friends Without Borders School in district Battambang
  Hong Teuk Nippon Foundation School in district Phnom Prek
  Kan Tourth Nippon Foundation School in district Kas Kra Lar
  Kbal Thnal Nippon Foundation School in district Sangker
  Kilolek Bourn Nippon Foundation School in district Mong Russei
  Kok Pon Nippon Foundation School in district Kas Kra Lar
  Kompong Chamlong Nippon Foundation School in district Kamrieng
  Komprang Nippon Foundation School in district Kamrieng
  Kon Ka Ek Nippon Foundation School in district Mong Russei
  Masanori Sugihara School in district Rôtâanak Môndûl
  Mithapheap Nippon Foundation School in district Kras Krolar
  O Ampil Nippon Foundation School in district Malay
  O Cham Long Nippon Foundation School in district Kamrieng
  O Chrey Nippon Foundation School in district Kamrieng
  O Krieth Nippon Foundation School in district Mong Russei
  O Lahong Nippon Foundation School in district Phnom Prek
  O Trav Chu Nippon Foundation School in district Sampouv Loun
  Licnoln-Sudbury Memorial School in district Thmar Kaul
  Phakdei Nippon Foundation School in district Ba Nan
  Phnom Rey Nippon Foundation School in district Samlot
  Phnom Touch Nippon Foundation School in district Phnom Prek
  Phoum Kor Nippon Foundation School in district Mong Russei
  Prek Am Nippon Foundation School in district Mong Russei
  Sam Seb Nippon Foundation School in district Kamrieng
  Samlot Nippon Foundation School in district Samlot
  Santhipeap Nippon Foundation School in district Samlot
  So O Choam School in district Samlot
  Sralao Tong Nippon Foundation School in district Kamrieng
  Sre Reach Nippon Foundation School in district Samlot
  Svay Bopharam Nippon Foundation School in district Mong Russei
  Svay Sar Nippon Foundation School in district Sangker
  Ta Krey Nippon Foundation School in district Kamrieng
  Ta Sanh Nippon Foundation School in district Samlot
  Tasda Nippon Foundation School in district Sampouv Loun
  Thmor Baing Don Tret Nippon Foundation School in district Samlot
  Tinderbox School in district Kamrieng
  Wild Swans School in district Sampov Lun

Kdol Doun Teav secondary school in district Kdol Doun Teav

Kampong Cham

  Aalborg School 2009 in district Chamkar Leu
  Aalborg School in district Thboung Khmum
  Ang Duong Academy in district Koh Sotin
  Aquas School 2 in district Dember
  Athlete’s Foot School in district Krauch Chhmar
  Black Hawk School in district Memot
  Boerne School of Hope in district Krauch Chhmar
  Cambridge School in district Cheung Prey
  Chey Mongkul Nippon Foundation School in district Srey Santhor
  Cincinnati Friendship School in district Stung Trang
  Cocanour-Gaudette Family and Friends School in district Punhear Krek
  Friendship School 1 in district Damber
  Friendship School 2 in district Dember
  Gene and Nora Hahn School in district Steung Trang
  Grace Church School in Cambodia in district Srey Santhor
  Green Family School 2 in district Tbaung Khmum
  Guy Leech School in district Krauch Chhmar
  Hiroko Okuma School in district Cheung Prey
  Karl Mendel School 2 in district Batheay
  Katsuko Miyagi School in district Batheay
  Kininn and Ayzas School of Hope in district Kang Meas
  Kork Srok Nippon Foundation School in district Dambe
  Kumomo Tree One School in district Batheay
  Kumomo Tree Two School in district Batheay
  Meyers Family Friendship School in district Kampong Siem
  Milton School in district Mean
  Nakry School in district Stung Trang
  Nayoro Keiryo School in district Prey Chhor
  Nightingale-Bamford School In Cambodia in district Kampong Siem
  O Svay Nippon Foundation School in district Kang Meas
  Oconomowoc Sister School of Cambodia in district Prey Chhor
  Poly Prep Mitapeap School in district Srey Santhor
  Prek Koy School in district Kang Meas
  Ralph Raphelson School in district Chamkar Leu
  Region Rejser School No. 2 in district Chheung Prey
  Robert Kiminecz School No. 1 in district Prey Chhor
  Rosenfeld Family School in district Prey Chhor
  Sakura School in district Chamkar Leu
  Sharing Foundation School in district Batheay
  Shrenzel School in district O Raing Euv
  Sunnyside School in district Prey Chor
  Takao Onoda School in district Chhoeung Prey
  Tokatsu Espoir School in district Kampong Siem
  Toranoko School in district Cheung Prey
  Toshio Nakamura School in district Batheay
  Valerie Quirk School of Hope in district Korng Meas
  Wright Family School in district Thboung Khmum
  Kome Hyappyo (100 Sacks of Rice) School in district Batheay
  Maki School in district Chhoeung Prey
  Sozaburo and Yasuko Inoue School in district Prey Chhor
  Yamamoto and Fujimori School in district Prey Chhor

Kampong Chhnang

  Aquas School 3 in district Rolea B'ier
  Cambodia Hope School in district Boribo
  JCVA School in district Tek Phos
  Kunja School in district Kampong Leng
  Margaret & Derek Jerram School in district Boribo
  Sasaki Family School in district Boribo
  Sharon A. Enright School of Hope in district Kampong Chhnang
  Stand for Change School in district Kampong Tralach
  Trapeang Kdar School in district Kampong Tralach

Kampong Speu

  Ratanak Grady Grossman School in district Oral
  Averbach/Popkin Family School in district Barset
  Clay Alexander Carson School in district Samrong Torng
  Curtis School in district Samrong Torng
  Dahlia Sam School in district Oral
  Develo Techno School in district Phnom Srouch
  Dicheycol School in district Odong
  Duke Gandin Memorial School in district Korng Pisei
  FCC School of Peace in district Odong
  Friendship School 3 in district Phnom Srouch
  Friendship School 4 in district Phnom Srouch
  Friendship School 5 in district Korng Pisei
  Gilbert M. Cogan Memorial School in district Korng Pisei
  Hardy and McRae Families School in district Phnom Srouch
  Harold and Elizabeth M. Spector School in district Korng Pisei
  Heart To Heart School in district Phnom Sruoch
  Lux et Lex School in district Oral
  Noble Path School in district O Dong
  Paul and Deborah Kavanaugh Free Academy in district Odong
  Peace School in district Samrong Torng
  Robert Miller and James Zebrowski Memorial School in district Samrong Torng
  Salam National School of Cambodia in district Baset
  Selva Luna Escuela in district Phnom Sruoch
  Shamballa Family School in district Ba Set
  Sophia Noelle Carson School in district Phnom Sruoch
  Sweet Life School in district Tporng
  Tokyo Inspired School in district Odong
  Ulla Tullberg School in district Phnom Sruoch
  Village of English School in district Basedth
  Coconut School

Kampong Thom

  Anne M. Resnik School in district Steung Sen
  Aquas Corporation School 4 in district Baray
  Beatrice & Ralph Lau School in district Staung
  Bradley Peterson Memorial Primary School in district Santuk
  Christine and Bill School in district San Tuk
  David and Deborah Roberts School in district Kampong Svay
  Each Other School in district Stung Sen
  Hayashida Sakunoshin Memorial School in district Prasat Balling
  Joan Shapiro Learning Center in district Kampong Thom
  Kirin School in district Prasat Balling
  Kirkland-Kompong Thom Academy in district Staung
  Kozak Ohana School in district Kampong Svay
  Michael Denny and Ed Schmauss School in district Baray
  Michèle Wade Memorial School in district Kampong Svay
  Naohiro Nishiya School in district Sandann
  Neil Richards School in district Baray
  Noguchi Family School in district Baray
  O Tnaot Nippon Foundation School in district Sandan
  Pramath Dey Nippon Foundation School in district Steung Sen
  School of Hope in district Stung Sen
  Schools-One Song in district Baray
  seas Friends School of Baray in district Baray
  Sralao Torng Nippon Foundation School in district Baray
  Sre Chang Nippon Foundation School in district Sandan
  Taing Krasao Nippon Foundation School in district Sandan
  Van and Sam Khong School in district Baray
  Vielmontgomery School in district Baray
  Yokogawa Rokumaru-kai School in district Prasat Balang

Kampot

  Athlete’s Foot School in district Chhouk
  Chres School of Grace in district Kampong Trach
  Doris Dillon School in district Banteay Meas
  Edamura- Komoro Hawaii School in district Kampong Trach
  Edison School in district Banteay Meas
  Freshfields School in district Banteay Meas
  Irene Pearson Bleha School in district Angkor Chey
  Kampong Trach School in district Kampong Trach
  Kuniko Koyama School in district Chhouk
  Louise M. Scarola School in district Chhouk
  Nowlen Family School Two in district Kampot
  Phnom Touch KDDI School in district Dang Tong
  Soma School in district Banteay Meas
  Steve & Mary Enterkin School in district Kampong Trach
  Sunrise School in district Banteay Meas
  Texas Peak School in district Chhouk
  Tokyo 2007 Marathon School in district Banteay Meas
  World Mate School Number Five in district Kampot

Kandal

  ACIS School in district Takhmao
  Aloha School in district Koh Thom
  An Dóchas School in district Kandal Steung
  Bel Canto School in district Kandal Steung
  Bob and Bernice School in district Khsach Kandal
  Chiaki Higono School in district Kandal Steung
  David Hughes School in district Kandal Steung
  Douglas & Vivienne Kenrick School in district Khsach Kandal
  Firefly School in district Lovea Em
  Grijalva Family & Friends School in district Kandal Steung
  Hiroko Shinno School in district Ksach Kandal
  ht Future Kids Home (complex) in district Kien Svay
  Jewish Helping Hands School In Memory of Barry R. Soffin in district Lovea Em
  Karl Mendel School in district Kien Svay
  Koh Khel Middle School – A Global Playground School in district Sa-ang
  Koh Knol Aloha School in district Kandal Steung
  Lotus School in district Khsach Kandal
  Nightingale School in district Ang Snuol
  Norodom Sihanouk School in district Kandal Steung
  Phnom Dei KEC School in district Ang Snuol
  President Barack Hussein Obama School in district Ang Snoul
  Prof. Raymond B. Cattell School in district Khsach Kandal
  Raymond T. Holton School in district Kandal Steung
  Richard Copaken School in district Angk Snuol
  Rideaid School in district Khsach Kandal
  Ridgewood Village School in district Khsach Kandal
  Sanlong KEC School in district Ksach Kandal
  Sayuri Watanabe School in district Kandal Stung
  Shinohara, Aono and SI East Ehime School in district Kandal Steung
  Shyam & Rajni Bajpai School in district Takhmao
  Willowbrook School in district Kandal Steung
  Zahn School in district Kien Svay

Kep

  Simon Harton Lewis School in district Damnak Chang-eur
  Son Sann School in district Damnak Chang-eur

Koh Kong

  Aoba School in district Sre Ambel
  Harris Family School in district Kompong Sela
  Humanity School For Young Cambodians in district Botumsakor
  Jack Bora Feeney School in district Kompong Sela
  John F. & Sautiavale Killian School in district Sre Ambel
  Kirivorn School in district Kompong Seila
  Masako Suiko School#2 in district Botom Sakor
  Mortgage Force School in district Kampong Seila
  Samdech Ta Nippon Foundation School in district Kampong Seila
  Sir Graham Balfour School in district Thmar Bang
  Ta Thorng Nippon Foundation School in district Sre Ambel
  Thnal Bombek Nippon Foundation School in district Kampong Seila
  Tokyo Katsushika-Higashi Rotary Club in district Sre Ambel
  Walter Kissinger Family School in district Sre Ambel
  Yukiko Ukai School in district Sre Ambel

Kompong Cham

  Kome Hyappyo (100 Sacks of Rice) School in district Batheay
  Maki School in district Chhoeung Prey
  Sozaburo and Yasuko Inoue School in district Prey Chhor
  Yamamoto and Fujimori School in district Prey Chhor

Kompong Chhnang

  Ann Morrison School in district Tek Phos
  Lvea School in district Kompong Leng
  World Mate School Number Three in district Kompong Leng

Kompong Speu

  George Mrus School in district Oral
  Lily School in district Samrong Torng
  Louise Zlatic Kielbik School in district Tpong
  O Tapong Nippon Foundation School in district Basit
  Pearl and Mary Flanders School in district O Ral
  Pothipreuk Nippon Foundation School in district Phnom Sruoch
  Roberts Family School in district O Ral
  Shinohara Manabu School in district Udong
  Tokyo-West Rotary Club School in district Phnom Srouch
  Violet Atkinson School in district O Ral

Kompong Thom

  David Nathan Meyerson School in district Stoung
  Diane Daniel School in district Stoung
  Graphis School in district Staung
  "With Love from Hokkaido” School in district Prasat Balling
  Kumiko Koyama School 2 in district Staung
  Kuniko Uchida-Kato School in district Stoung
  Miyazaki Honten School in district Stoung
  Srei Devata School in district Baray
  World Mate School Number Two in district Stoung

Kratie

  Chroy Banteay Nippon Foundation School in district Prek Prasob
  Damrei Phong Nippon Foundation School in district Chhlong
  Dodge School in district Chhlaung
  Doun Meas Nippon Foundation School in district Snoul
  Ezer & Andy School in district Snuol
  Hans Christian Andersen School I in district Sambo
  Jeff Pahutski Memorial School in district Chhlaung
  John Burroughs Snuol School in district Snuol
  Kampong Sre Nippon Foundation School in district Chhlong
  Little Mermaid School in district Sambo
  O Tanoeng Nippon Foundation School in district Sambo
  Rokar Thom Nippon Foundation School in district Prek Prasob
  Sampong Nippon Foundation School in district Kratie
  Sandan II Nippon Foundation School in district Sam Bo
  Soroptimist International of Osaka-Chuo School in district Snuol
  Thnout Nippon Foundation School in district Kratie

Mondolkiri

  Prech School in district Pech Chenda
  Non No School in district Picheada
  Ascham School Community in district O Raing
  Ascham School in district Sen Monorom
  Cobbitty School in district Pech Chenda
  Elizabeth Rinehart Ohrstrom School in district Sen Monorom
  Hiroko Kato School in district Picheada
  Masako Suiko School in district Oreang
  O Te Nippon Foundation School in district Keo Seima
  Sre Chrey Nippon Foundation School in district Koh Nhek
  Sre Preah KEC school in district Keo Seima
  Suiryo School in district O Raing

Oddar Meanchey

  Donum Amicitiae School in district Chong Kal
  Preah Kun (Grace) School in district Chong Kal

Pailin

  Bor Tangsuor Nippon Foundation School in district Pailin
  Bor Yakhar Nippon Foundation School in district Pailin
  Knights of Cambodia School in district Sala Krao
  Kon Phnom Nippon Foundation School in district Salakrao
  Overlake School in district Pailin
  Phnom Koy Nippon Foundation School in district Salakrao
  Rattanak Sophorn Nippon Foundation School in district Pailin
  Suon Ampov Leu Nippon Foundation School in district Pailin

Preah Sihanouk

  Peter Ehrenhaft School in district Krong Preah Sihanouk
  Samdech Euv KDDI School in district Krong Preah Sihanouk

Preah Vihear

  Duncan and Virginia Holthausen School in district Rovieng
  Bank Street School of Cambodia in district Rovieng
  Brad Washburn School in district Ro Vieng
  Brookline Samlahn School in district Sangkum Thmei
  Daniele Derossi School in district Choâm Ksant
  Dixon Learning Center in district Ro Vieng
  Dyer Family Friendship School in district Tbeng Meanchey
  Elaine and Nicholas Negroponte School in district Rôvieng
  Flavia Robinson School in district Choâm Ksant
  Gertrude M. Parker and Beatrice S. Leong School in district Kulen
  Guido A. & Elizabeth H. Binda Foundation School in district Choâm Ksant
  House of Joy and Happiness in district Rovieng
  Ian Tilden School in district Choam Ksan
  Jim and Eileen Wilson School in district Tbeng Meanchey
  Kampot Nippon Foundation School in district Rovieng
  Kate and Elizabeth Wiener School in district Kulen
  Kazuko Nishie School in district Tobia Meanchey
  Marjorie and Elwood Malos School in district Rovieng
  O Ta Lok Nippon Foundation School in district Rovieng
  Passport School in district Sangkum Thmei
  Phom O KEC School in district Rovieng
  Piero Derossi School in district Choâm Ksant
  Rom Chek Nippon Foundation School in district Rovieng
  Rom Chek Nippon Foundation School in district Rovieng
  Sre Thom Nippon Foundation School in district Rovieng
  St. Paul's School of Hope in district Sangkum Thmei
  Thkeng Nippon Foundation School in district Rovieng
  Tokyo Shintoshin Rotary Club School in district Rôvieng
  Wakako Hironaka School in district Rôvieng
  Yokkaichi School in district Rovieng
  Yutaka Araki School in district Tbeng Meanchey
  Bellingham Community School in district Rovieng

Prey Veng

  Alvash and Betsy Dearth School in district Kampong Trabek
  Arthur Ochs Sulzberger Family School in district Peam Ror
  Bernie Krisher School in district Peam Chor
  Brighter Tomorrow School in district Pearaing
  Cambodia Portledge School in district Kanhchreach
  Diana and Al Kaff School in district Peam Chor
  Florida Gulf Coast University Lower Secondary School in district Kamchay Mear
  FordHarrison School in district Preah Sdach
  Friends of Judith Wolf School in district Pearaing
  Ida M. Holtsinger School in district Sithor Kandal
  JABS Family School in district Kampong Trabek
  Jaimie Sheth and Chi Tran School in district Kamchay Mear
  Janna Roeters (2000-08-25) School in district Pearaing
  John Coats School in district Me Sang
  John's School in district Peam Chor
  Ka Hale Kula Ānuenue School in district Kampong Leav
  Kazue and Hiroshi Sasaki School in district Preah Sdach
  Khut Chhorn Memorial School in district Bar Phnom
  Kristof School in district Peam Ror
  Lee Rudlin School in district Preah Sdach
  Lilies of Hope School in district Por Rieng
  Mary Helen Smith School in district Peam Ro
  Morris and Shirley Weinstein School in district Bar Phnom
  Paul Singh School in district Peam Chor
  POE School in district Kampong Leav
  Prey Kanlaong Village School in district Kampong Leav
  QA School in district Preah Sdach
  Richard Teo School in district Sithor Kandal
  Rieko Yano School in district Kompong Trabek
  Ronald Winston School in district Pearaing
  Santori School in district Sithor Kandal
  SOIS School of Hope in district Kamchay Mear
  Spean School in district Kampong Trabek
  Teruko Saito School in district Ba Phnum
  Uncle Mark Lutz School in district Prey Veng
  World Mate School Number Ten in district Pearaing
  World Mate School Number One in district Peam Ro
  Youthevong School in district Sithor Kandal

Pursat

  Alexander Brest School in district Bakan
  Anlong Kray Nippon Foundation School in district Bakan
  Credit Suisse-First Boston School in district Bakan
  CREDO School in district Bakan
  Ryan F. Waldron School in district Phnom Kravanh
  Janie’s School in district Bakan
  Kdey Krav Nippon Foundation School in district Sampouv Meas
  Koh Rumdori Nippon Foundation School in district Kra Kot
  Lefkowitz Family School in district Bakan
  Prey Kub Nippon Foundation School in district Phnom Kravanh
  Prey Roung Nippon Foundation School in district Bakan
  Prey Svay Nippon Foundation School in district Bakan
  Princess and the Pea School in district Kandieng
  Ro Bas Raing Nippon Foundation School in district Bakan
  Sam Rong Nippon Foundation School in district Phnom Kravang
  Serey School in district Krakor
  Talo Nippon Foundation School in district Bakan

Ratanakiri

  100 Friends School in district O Ya Dav
  Adler Family School in district Lumphat
  Caramanico School in district Koun Mom
  Develo School No. One in district Andoung Meas
  Develo School No. Two in district Koan Mom
  Ezra Vogel School in district Banlung
  Gloria and Henry Jarecki Special Skills School in district O Chum
  Hqs. Building/Library in district O Chum
  Mustafa Saeed Rahman School in district O Chum
  Jack and Helen King School in district Koun Mom
  Josef and Maria Baumann School in district Koun Mom
  Kamata Family School in district Kaun Mom
  Keizo School in district Bar Keo
  Mary Huston Schuyler School in district Bar Keo
  Miki Group Cattleya School in district Lumphat
  Morris and Phyllis Gold School in district O Chum
  Mr. and Mrs. Sak Nhep School in district Lum Phat
  Nicholas and Zachary Poor School in district Koan Mom
  Nicholas Palevsky School in district Koan Mom
  Patrick and Jackie Donnelly School in district Bo Keov
  Preap Sar (Dove) School in district O Chum
  Rainbow School in district Lumphat
  Ruth G. Kimball School in district O Chum
  Sapporo Acasia Lions Club School in district Koan Mom
  Sean McDonald School in district O’Ya daov
  Sophie A. Krasowski School in district O Ya Dav
  Star Fire Flower Foundation School in district Voeunsai
  Wendy Stedman Banbury School in district Voeun Sai
  Alkire Family School in district O Chum
  Honolulu-Pusan-Shimbashi-Taipei Rotary Clubs School in district Ban Lung
  World Mate School Number Eight in district Kon Mom
  World Mate School Number Seven in district Bo Keo

Siem Reap

  Aeon Bougainvillea School in district Sotr Nikum
  Aeon Delonix School in district Sotr Nikum
  Aeon Jackfruit School in district Pourk
  Aeon Jasminum School in district Chi Kreng
  Aeon Lime School in district Chi Kreng
  Aeon Lychee School in district Chi Kreng
  Aeon Mango School in district Pourk
  Aeon Orange School in district Chi Kreng
  Aeon Papaya School in district Chi Kreng
  Aeon Rain Tree School in district Sotr Nikum
  Andrea School in district Saut Nikum
  ASIJ School in district Svay Leu
  Bob and Ruth Shapiro School in district Prasat Bakong
  Brigitte and Michael Rennie School in district Kralanh
  Butterfly Effect School in district Srey Snom
  Chippewa School in district Angkor Chum
  Chop KDDI School in district Siem Reap
  Engelstoft Family and Friends School in district Soutr Nikom
  Engelstoft Family School in district Pouk
  Hikari School in district Kralanh
  International School of Siem Reap in Siem Reap
  Keishi Hasegawa School in district Chikreng
  Kimino Yume Mezaseba Kanau School in district Varin
  Meyers Family School in district Chikreng
  Mirai Step School in district Srey Snom
  Miss Kayoko Higuchi School in district Saut Nikum
  Monique Brousseau School in district Chikreng
  Nozomi School in district Saut
  Oneness-Family School in district Banteay Srey
  PEPY Ride School in district Kralanh
  PPSEAWA Hawaii Cambodia School in district Sotr Nikom
  Princess 1 School in district Saut Nikum
  Princess 1 School in district Saut Nikum
  Princess 2 School in district Banteay Srey
  Pulliam-Ar-Lao-Shuford (P.A.L.S) School in district Kralanh
  R.S. Rosenfeld School in district Banteay Srey
  Region Rejser School 3 in district Kralanh
  Reiko and Seiichi Kanise School in district Angkor Chum
  Rev. Kenneth Shull School in district Pouk
  Sage Insights School in district Pouk
  Scrum School in district Angkor Chum
  Seng Kheang School in district Siem Reap
  Stefan Ellis School in district Siem Reap
  Tatsuo Maruyama School in district Cheykreng
  Vineyard School in district Siem Reap
  Wartell/Salomon School in district Chikreng
  World Mate School Number Nine in district Srey Snam

Sihanoukville

  Bangkok Airways School in district Prey Noup
  Dorothy and Saul Katz School in district Prey Nob
  Kome Hyappyo (100 Sacks of Rice) School No. Two in district Prey Nob
  Morota and Sato School in district Prey Noup
  Nowlen Family School One in district Prey Nob
  Puerto Rico School in district Prey Noup
  Region Rejser School No. 1 in district Prey Noup
  Rotary Centennial School No. 1 in district Prey Noup
  Rotary Centennial School No. 2 in district Prey Noup
  Seattle-Sihanoukville Friendship School in district Prey Nob
  Taiko Iwase School in district Khan Prey Nup

Stung Treng

  Stung Treng School in district Stung Treng
  Calean Maria School in district Siem Book
  Elizabeth A. Ross School in district Stung Treng
  Fred White Memorial School in district Sesan
  IROHA School in district Thala Barivat
  Lyhou School in district Thala Barivat
  O Meah School in district Siem Book
  PEPY Friends School in district Siem Bouk
  Siem Bok Nippon Foundation School in district Siem Bok
  Thelma F. Raffensperger School in district Sesan

Svay Rieng

  Akiko Okayama School in district Kampong
  Chhleu Teal KDDI School in district Svay Chrom
  Eugene Katz School in district Svay Theab
  Hun Sen Prasot School in district Svay Teab
  Svay Rieng School in district Svay Rieng
  Hawaii Ohana School in district Svay Chrom
  JC Hosken School of Peace in district Rumduol
  Kikkoman School in district Svay Chrom
  Osamu and Noriko Sugita School in district Romeas Hek
  Other Guys School in district Romeas Heik
  Rachel Trout and Emma Tate School in district Romeas Heik
  Sophy Joy Berry and Mark Sopha Berry School in district Romdoul
  Yoon Soon Jung School in district Chantrear

Takéo

Uddar Meanchey

  O Koki Kandal School in district Anlong Veng
  Alex and Lily Talarico School in district Samrong
  Charles B. Wang – Computer Associates School No. One in district Samrong
  Charles B. Wang – Computer Associates School No. Two in district Samrong
  Chhe Teal Chrum Nippon Foundation School in district Anlong Veng
  Ta Dav Nippon Foundation School in district Anlong Veng
  Trabek Nippon Foundation School in district Samrong
  World Mate School Number Four in district Samrong
  World Mate School Number Six in district Anlong Veng

See also

 Education in Cambodia
 Lists of schools

References

Schools
Schools
Cambodia
Cambodia